Characodon is a genus of splitfins endemic to north–central Mexico. Two of the species are highly threatened and restricted to pools, ponds and springs in the upper San Pedro Mezquital River basin in Durango. The third species, C. garmani, was restricted to springs near Parras in Coahuila, but it became extinct when they dried out.

Species
There are currently three recognized species in this genus, although some authorities consider the genus to be monospecific, containing only Characodon lateralis with the other two species classified in the genus Goodea.

 Characodon audax M. L. Smith & R. R. Miller, 1986 (Bold characodon)
 †Characodon garmani D. S. Jordan & Evermann, 1898 (Parras characodon)
 Characodon lateralis Günther, 1866 (Rainbow characodon)

† = Extinct

References

 
Goodeinae
Freshwater fish of Mexico
Endemic fish of Mexico
Freshwater fish genera
Taxa named by Albert Günther
Ray-finned fish genera
Taxonomy articles created by Polbot